In celestial mechanics, orbital precession may refer to either of two types:
Apsidal precession
Nodal precession